The Venerable  Theodore Maurice (1670 - 1731)  was  Archdeacon of Tuam  from 1706 until his death.

Notes

1670 births
1731 deaths
Irish Anglicans
Archdeacons of Tuam
Alumni of Trinity College Dublin